Abbott Lawrence Pattison (May 15, 1916 – April 16, 1999) was an American sculptor and abstract artist.

Life

Internationally known as a sculptor, American artist Abbott Pattison worked primarily in cast bronze, welded brass and carved marble. Recognition of his talent first came in his hometown of Chicago through representation by the Fairweather-Hardin Gallery, but his reputation soon spread nationally, with eight one-man exhibits in New York City at The Downtown Gallery and Edith Halpern Gallery. Later he was also represented in Los Angeles by The Feingarten Gallery, and in London by The Alwin Gallery.

Abbott Pattison was born May 15, 1916 to William and Bonnie Pattison, the second of seven children. His father was a well-known real estate developer of the city. He first attended art classes at The Art Institute of Chicago at the age of 10, while a student of Francis Parker School. Later he chose to enroll at Yale University because of their art program. While there, he was thoroughly trained in classical traditions of drawing, fresco painting and the Sienese style of egg tempera, eventually choosing sculpture as his primary art form.

After he graduated with a Liberal Arts Degree in 1937, he enrolled in the Master’s program at Yale, and graduated with a Degree in Fine Arts in 1939.  Among the fifty-two students who graduated from the art/architecture department that year, Pattison was awarded first prize, which was a traveling fellowship, and he chose to travel to Northern China and Japan for six months. While in China, he lived in a mountain village 150 miles from Peking with a Franciscan priest who was building a Catholic church in stone quarried from a nearby mountain, Pattison carved Twelve Stations of the Cross for the monastery with the assistance of several local stone masons. Next traveling in Japan, Abbott Pattison was arrested as a spy, but soon released. He warned his interrogators that he would return to Japan, but the next time he would be wearing a uniform.

Upon his return to The United States in 1940, Pattison went directly into Officer’s Training School. From 1942 to 1945, he was given active command as Captain of a Pacific Command Sub Chaser, doing convoy duty between Hawaii and the Midway Islands. He was promoted to First Executive Officer on a Destroyer Escort, and was thereafter given full command as Captain of a second Destroyer Escort, running convoys across the Pacific from Florida to the African Coast and into the Mediterranean. He won a Military Merit medal for personal bravery, and his ship received battle stars for downing several German fighter planes. Pattison noted that the only regular paycheck he ever received was from that time when he served as an officer in the United States Navy. 

At the end of World War II, Abbott Pattison returned to Chicago, and to his art, so that by 1946 he was well-known in art circles as the youthful recipient of both the Logan and Eisendrath awards, and as a recipient of one of the four prizes awarded nationally to sculptors by The Metropolitan Museum. He joined the faculty of The Art Institute of Chicago as an instructor of sculpture.

In 1953, Pattison was a visiting sculptor at The University of Georgia, and was asked to return the following year as a sculptor in residence with no teaching duties, having been honored for a second time with the Pauline Palmer Prize for sculpture. At the University, Pattison carved a large marble sculpture, titled Mother and Child and went on to create a 12-foot high abstract horse for the campus in welded plate steel, now called familiarly The Iron Horse. At the time, this sculpture represented the cutting-edge of avant-garde art in the United States. The sculpture was placed in front of the dormitory of the University’s football team, and angry students attacked the horse with spray paint, manure, fire and hammers, with the art department professors merely looking on. The Athens, Georgia police force was called in to quell the disturbance. This event became famous as the first official riot on an American college campus, and became the feature of a Public Broadcasting System movie special. The quarter-inch thick boiler plate steel sculpture withstood the attack and remains intact, but it was immediately removed from the campus and has never returned, sitting in a local farmer’s field since 1954.

Abbott Pattison regarded all sculptors, presently living or throughout time, as his kin. His work was inspired by classical Classical Greek and Etruscan forms, elements of which he interpreted in creating his abstract bronzes, welded braised figures, and marble carvings.

Prior to attending Yale, Pattison did more drawing and painting than sculpture. It was at Yale that he decided to work mostly in sculpture. However, he often exhibited his paintings, watercolors and terra cotta sculptures alongside his bronze sculptures at gallery shows.

Shortly before his death in 1999, Pattison advised his artist son Harry: “If an artist can manage to paint four or five great paintings in a lifetime that’s all that is necessary. It isn’t easy.” 

Abbott Pattison spent his summers at his home and studio on the coast of Maine, occasionally teaching at The Skowhegan School of Painting and Sculpture, where he also served on their Board of Governors. He spent his winters in Florence, Italy where the bronze foundry that cast his works is located. The rest of his time he worked in his Chicago studio, occasionally teaching at the Art Institute of Chicago.  He continued working to the day of his death at age 82.

Currently more than thirty of Pattison’s works are on public display throughout Chicago, and his sculptures are in the collections of universities, corporations and museums worldwide, including the Whitney Museum in New York City, the Art Institute of Chicago, the Corcoran Museum in Washington, D.C., the San Francisco Museum and the Museum of the Israeli State in Jerusalem. Five of his pieces are owned by the United States State Department and are located in embassies overseas. One of Abbott Pattison’s sculptures is in Buckingham Palace, London.

Education and experience 

 Graduate of Yale College, 1937 B.A.
 Yale School of Fine Arts, 1939 M.F.A.
 Lived and worked in China and Japan, 1940
 US Navy, 1942-45, Served as Captain of Destroyer Escort and P.C. Sub-Chaser
 Instructor Art Institute School, 1946-52
 Worked in France, 1950-51
 Visiting Sculptor, University of Georgia, 1953
 Sculptor in Residence, University of Georgia, 1954
 Teacher of Sculpture, Skowhegan Summer Art School, 1955-56
 Worked in Florence, Italy 1955-56 and frequently thereafter

Exhibitions 

 Art Institute of Chicago
 Metropolitan Museum
 Whitney Museum
 Pennsylvania Academy
 Oakland Museum
 Univ. of Notre Dame
 Birmingham Museum
 San Francisco Museum
 Cali. Palace of the Legion of Honor
 Cincinnati Museum
 Feingarten Galleries, Los Angeles
 Fairweather-Hardin Gallery, Chicago
 Wellfleet Art Gallery
 Georgia State Museum
 Univ. of Miami
 Univ. of Pittsburgh
 Bates College
 Colby College
 8 One-man shows in New York City (formerly represented by Downtown Gallery)

Prizes 

 1939 First Travelling Fellowship, Yale Univ.
 1942 Logan Prize, Art Institute of Chicago
 1946 Eisendrath Prize, Art Institute of Chicago
 1950 and 1953 Pauline Palmer Prize (sculpture), Art Institute of Chicago
 1951 Metropolitan Museum $1500 Award in 1st Contemporary American Sculpture Show
 1963 Prize International Sculpture Show, Bundy Museum, Vermont
 1968 Clussman Prize: Art Institute of Chicago
 And others

Permanent museum collections 

 Whitney Museum
 Art Institute of Chicago
 Israeli State Museum
 Chrysler Museum
 Portland Museum
 Corcoran Museum
 San Francisco Museum
 California Palace of the Legion of Honor
 Addison Gallery, American Art
 St. Louis Museum
 Georgia Museum of Art at University of Georgia
 Phoenix Museum
 St. Paul Art Center
 La Jolla Art Center
 Evansville, Indiana Museum
 Davenport Museum
 Davenport Museum of Fine Arts
 Palm Springs Desert Museum
 Wichita Museum
 Flint Institute of Arts
 Farnsworth Museum

Artworks

References

External links

Abbott Pattison Artwork
Abbott Pattison at askART

1916 births
1999 deaths
American abstract artists
Yale University alumni
Art Institute of Chicago
United States Navy personnel of World War II
United States Navy officers